Baron Nils Erik Wilhelm af Wetterstedt (November 8, 1815 – January 1, 1887) was a Swedish diplomat and translator of opera libretti. In his early career he worked in the Swedish Foreign Office and had diplomatic posts in Vienna, Berlin, the Hague and Copenhagen. In 1857 he was appointed Swedish-Norwegian envoy to the United States. He was recalled at the outbreak of the American Civil War and then served as Minister Plenipotentiary to the Netherlands, in late 1864 he returned to North America as minister to Washington and envoy to the Second Mexican Empire. He ended his diplomatic career in 1870, due to his ill health, and died in Skövde in 1887.

References

1815 births
1887 deaths
Swedish translators
19th-century translators
Ambassadors of Sweden to the United States
Ambassadors of Sweden to Mexico
Ambassadors of Sweden to the Netherlands
People from Stockholm